The Icelandic Elf School is an organization located in Reykjavík, Iceland, that teaches visitors about Icelandic folklore.

The organization teaches about the hidden people and the 13 different kinds of elves that the organization believes inhabit the country of Iceland. According to the organization's headmaster, hidden people "are just the same size and look exactly like human beings, the only difference is that they are invisible to most of us. Elves, on the other hand, aren’t entirely human, they’re humanoid, starting at around eight centimetres".

The organization is headed by Magnús Skarphéðinsson. Magnús has a full curriculum, and certificate programs for visitors. However, the organization also publishes texts on hidden people, partly for its own use in the classroom. The school organizes five hour long educational excursions for visitors. Since opening in 1991, over 9,000 people, most of them foreigners, have attended the organization. The Álfaskólinn also provides "aura readings" and "past-life explorations".

See also 
 Fairy Investigation Society
 Cottingley Fairies

Notes

Further reading
 Rakoff, David, Fraud: Essays (Broadway Books: 2002) pp. 85 ff.
 Baldacchino, Godfrey, Extreme Tourism: Lessons from the World's Cold Water Islands (Elsevier Science: 2006) pp. 121–122
 Sullivan, Paul, Waking Up in Iceland (Sanctuary Publishing: 2003) p. 117
 Baedeker: Iceland, (Mairs Geographischer Verlag: 2009) p. 246
 Packard, Mary, Ripley's Believe It or Not!: Strange School Stories (Scholastic: 2010)

External links
 Archive of Magnús Skarphéðinsson's old webpage
 Amazing Iceland: In search of elves
 Elf School website

Tourism in Iceland
Elves
Cultural education
Culture in Reykjavík
Educational institutions established in 1991
1991 establishments in Iceland
Schools in Iceland
Education in Reykjavík